Alamdan-e Olya (also Romanized as ‘Alamdān-e ‘Olyā; also known as ‘Alamdān-e Bālā) is a village in Dezh Gah Rural District, Dehram District, Farashband County, Fars Province, Iran. At the 2006 census, its population was 209, in 49 families.

References 

Populated places in Farashband County